Reg District (Balochi/) is located in the southern part of Kandahar Province in Afghanistan. It borders Helmand Province to the west, Panjwai and Daman districts to the north, Shorabak District to the east and Chagai District in Balochistan, Pakistan, to the south. 

The population of Reg District was 7,900 in 2006, mostly Baloch and Pashtun tribes. The district center is the village Reg Alaqadari, which is located in the most southeastern part of the district - a few miles north from the Durand Line (Afghanistan-Pakistan border).

Security in and around the district is maintained by the Afghan National Security Forces, mainly the Afghan Border Police. The whole district is a desert and there are only a few larger settlements. There is a small official Afghanistan-Pakistan border checkpoint and border crossing in the district.

See also 
Districts of Afghanistan
Geography of Afghanistan
Transport in Afghanistan

References

External links

AIMS District Map

Districts of Kandahar Province